Ai-Mitsu (June 24, 1907 - January 19, 1946) was a Japanese artist and painter. He was also known as Akemitsu or his birth name, Nichiro Ishimura. He is usually identified as a Surrealist although he also painted works that can be classified in other styles and genres.

He was born into a small landowning family in 1907 in Hiroshima, and given the name Nichiro Ishimura, which he later changed to Ai-Mitsu when he moved to Tokyo to pursue his career as an artist. In 1934 he married Kie, a teacher of the deaf who helped support him through his struggles as an artist. His most famous work is "Landscape with an Eye" (1938), currently held in the collection of the National Museum of Modern Art, Tokyo. It consists of shapeless forms with a large eye in a landscape setting.

In 1944 he was conscripted and sent to China in the months after the war, where he died of a fever, possibly due to malaria and dysentery, on the outskirts of Shanghai.

In March - May 2007, a retrospective exhibition commemorating the 100th anniversary of Aimitsu's birthday was held at the National Museum of Modern Art, Tokyo.

References 

 Richardson, Michael, 'Ai Mitsu', Papers of Surrealism, issue 8, 2010

1907 births
1946 deaths
People from Hiroshima Prefecture
20th-century Japanese painters